Remance is a corregimiento in San Francisco District, Veraguas Province, Panama with a population of 1,618 as of 2010. Its population as of 1990 was 1,806; its population as of 2000 was 1,807.

References

Corregimientos of Veraguas Province